The Italian general election of 1979 took place on 3 June 1979.

In Veneto Christian Democracy was, as usual, the largest party and obtained the majority of valid votes with 50.1% for the last time.

Results

Chamber of Deputies
Source: Regional Council of Veneto

Provincial breakdown
Source: Regional Council of Veneto

Senate
Source: Regional Council of Veneto

Elections in Veneto
General, Veneto